Kristján Uni Óskarsson (born 4 February 1984) is an Icelandic alpine skier. He competed in two events at the 2006 Winter Olympics.

References

1984 births
Living people
Kristján Uni Óskarsson
Kristján Uni Óskarsson
Alpine skiers at the 2006 Winter Olympics
Place of birth missing (living people)
21st-century Icelandic people